A Man with Dead Birds, and Other Figures, in a Stable (c. 1655) is an oil-on-canvas painting by the Dutch painter Pieter de Hooch. It is an example of Dutch Golden Age painting and is now in the National Gallery, London.

This painting was documented by Hofstede de Groot in 1908, who wrote:269. SOLDIER, A WOMAN WITH A CHILD, AND DEAD GAME IN A STABLE. In the left foreground a soldier, seen in profile to the right, is seated on the floor plucking a dead bird. In front of him to the right is a heap of dead birds, at which a dog is sniffing. In the middle, farther back, stands a young woman with a child at her breast. To her right the soldier's cloak hangs on a post, and behind her to the right another garment, seen in full light, is thrown over a wooden partition. Above the woman's head is a window, between two cross-beams. In the middle of the background a gentleman with long curls, a slouch hat, and a cloak, enters at the stable-door. Panel, 21 1/2 inches by 19 1/2 inches. Exhibited at Leyden, 1906, No. 21. In the collection of F. Fleischmann, London.

According to the museum, X-ray photography shows that the dog and dead birds were painted over the figure of a wounded man.
 
Modern analysis of the provenance and paint analysis leads to the conclusion that the 19th-century painter Ignatius Van Regemorter (1795–1873) was probably the one who did the overpainting, at some time after he or his father purchased it in 1825. The painting was later sold in 1900 for 85 guineas as a work by Jan Baptist Weenix and was donated to the museum in 1929. It was described in later catalogues as "a collaborative work by Weenix and de Hooch", but there has never been any evidence the two painters worked together.

Wounded man painting
Various provenance records mention a wounded man by De Hooch which were previously thought to pertain to another painting by the artist, but could also be this painting.

References

External links
A Man with Dead Birds research blog by Marjorie E. Wieseman on the museum website

1650s paintings
Paintings by Pieter de Hooch
Collections of the National Gallery, London
Birds in art
Dogs in art